Edward Dow (11 July 1820 – 1894) was an American architect from New Hampshire.

Life and career
Dow was born in Lemington, Vermont, July 11, 1820. The son of a carpenter, he began learning his father's trade at a young age.  At the age of 16, the family moved to Newport, New Hampshire, where young Dow began an apprenticeship with Ruel Durkee.  In 1847 he moved to Concord and established himself as a carpenter.  By 1851 he had established the firm of Colby & Dow, builders, with J. M. Colby.  Around 1856 he set out on his own again, this time as an architect.

He remained in private practice until 1876, when he took Giles Wheeler (1834-1915) into Dow & Wheeler.  Wheeler had, years before, apprenticed with Colby & Dow, and had rejoined the firm in 1873.  The two worked together until 1885, when Wheeler left to supervise the construction of the new U. S. Post Office.  However, Dow continued to practice as Dow & Wheeler until 1890.  That year, James E. Randlett (1846-1909), formerly the keeper of the state house, became a partner.  Dow & Randlett was dissolved upon Dow's death in 1894.

From at least 1882 until 1892, architect Albert E. Bodwell (1851-1926) was apparently Dow's chief designer.  He left to establish his own office with Charles E. Sargent in 1892.

Dow's nephew, Wallace L. Dow, studied architecture with Dow & Wheeler from 1877 to 1880, when he left New Hampshire for South Dakota, where he would become a noted architect.

Selected works

Edward Dow, c.1856-1876
 1857 - Phenix Hotel, 46 N Main St, Concord, New Hampshire
 Demolished.
 1859 - House for George E. Jenks, 76 School St, Concord, New Hampshire
 1859 - St. Paul's Episcopal Church, 21 Centre St, Concord, New Hampshire
 1860 - New Hampshire State Prison Warehouse, 2½ Beacon St, Concord, New Hampshire
 1863 - Concord High School, 27 N State St, Concord, New Hampshire
 Burned in 1888.
 1866 - Littleton High School, High & School Sts, Littleton, New Hampshire
 Demolished.
 1866 - New Hampshire Statesman Building, 18 N Main St, Concord, New Hampshire
 1866 - Penacook Academy, 116 N Main St, Boscawen, New Hampshire
 1868 - Hill Block, 66 N Main St, Concord, New Hampshire
 1868 - Trinity M. E. Church, 137 Main St, Montpelier, Vermont
 1869 - Culver Hall, New Hampshire College, Hanover, New Hampshire
 Demolished.
 1872 - Charlestown Town Hall, 11 Summer St, Charlestown, New Hampshire
 1872 - Newport Town Hall, 20 Main St, Newport, New Hampshire
 Burned and partially rebuilt in 1885.
 1872 - Trinity Episcopal Church, 247 Main St, Tilton, New Hampshire
 1873 - Board of Trade Building, 83-85 N Main St, Concord, New Hampshire
 Largely demolished.
 1874 - Conant Hall, New Hampshire College, Hanover, New Hampshire
 Demolished.
 1876 - Morrill Bros. Block, 55 N Main St, Concord, New Hampshire

Dow & Wheeler, 1876-1882
 1877 - House for Alvah W. Sulloway, 26 Peabody Pl, Franklin, New Hampshire
 Demolished.
 1878 - New Hampshire State Prison, 281 N State St, Concord, New Hampshire
 1879 - Tilton Town Hall, 257 Main St, Tilton, New Hampshire
 1880 - Nashua Union Station, Temple St, Nashua, New Hampshire
 Demolished.
 1881 - Penacook Fire Station, 25 Washington St, Penacook, New Hampshire
 1881 - The Temple, Temple Ave, Ocean Park, Maine
 1882 - Memorial Arch, Tilton Arch Park, Northfield, New Hampshire
 1883 - Northfield Union Church, Sondogardy Pond Rd, Northfield, New Hampshire
 1884 - West Street Ward House, 41 West St, Concord, New Hampshire
 1887 - Bank Block, 291 Main St, Tilton, New Hampshire
 1887 - House for Charles C. Danforth, 39 Green St, Concord, New Hampshire
 Demolished.
 1887 - Perkins Inn, Old Henniker & Hopkinton Rds, Hopkinton, New Hampshire
 Demolished.
 1888 - Odd Fellows Building, 18 Pleasant St, Concord, New Hampshire
 1888 - West Concord Fire Station, 450 N State St, West Concord, New Hampshire
 1889 - "The Boulders" for A. Perley Fitch, 150 Garnet St, Sunapee, New Hampshire
 Demolished.
 1889 - Orphans' Home of Concord, 1942 Dunbarton Rd, Concord, New Hampshire
 Demolished.
 1890 - Concord Gas Light Building, 24 Bridge St, Concord, New Hampshire

Dow & Randlett, 1890-1894
 1892 - Bristol Savings Bank Building, 10 N Main St, Bristol, New Hampshire
 1892 - Conant Hall, University of New Hampshire, Durham, New Hampshire
 1892 - Epping Town Hall, 157 Main St, Epping, New Hampshire
 1892 - Thompson Hall, University of New Hampshire, Durham, New Hampshire
 1893 - Antrim Town Hall, 66 Main St, Antrim, New Hampshire
 1893 - Phenix Hall, 40 N Main St, Concord, New Hampshire
 1893 - "Pleasant View" for Mary Baker Eddy, 227 Pleasant St, Concord, New Hampshire
 Demolished.
 1894 - Y. M. C. A. Building, 12 N State St, Concord, New Hampshire

References

1820 births
1894 deaths
Architects from New Hampshire
19th-century American architects
People from Lemington, Vermont
People from Newport, New Hampshire
People from Concord, New Hampshire